Eutetrapha lini is a species of beetle in the family Cerambycidae. It was described by Chou, Chung and Lin in 2014. It is known from Taiwan.

References

Saperdini
Beetles described in 2014